Nan Moe Moe Htwe (born 11 June 1983) is a Burmese politician who currently serves as an Amyotha Hluttaw MP for Kayin State No. 4 Constituency. She is a member of National League for Democracy.

Early life and education
She was born on 11 June 1983 in Hlaingbwe, Myanmar. She is an ethnic Karen. She graduated with M.Sc. (Zoology) from Hpa-An University.

Political career
She is a member of the National League for Democracy. In the 2015 Myanmar general election, she was elected as an Amyotha Hluttaw MP, winning a majority of 11,414 votes and elected representative from Kayin State No.4 parliamentary constituency.

References

National League for Democracy politicians
1983 births
Living people
People from Kayin State
Burmese people of Karen descent